Persoonia terminalis, also known as the Torrington geebung, is a shrub belonging to the family Proteaceae, and native to northern New South Wales and southern Queensland in eastern Australia.  Reported as a subspecies of Persoonia nutans in 1981, it was described as a species by Lawrie Johnson and his colleague Peter Weston in 1991.

Two subspeciesP.t.terminalis and P.t.recurvaare recognised; both are found on well-drained acidic soils in sclerophyll forests, and P.t.terminalis is also found on granite outcrops. Although similar in appearance, they differ in leaf length and curvature. Both have a restricted range, with P.t.terminalis found in an area of under .

The yellow flowers mainly appear in December and January (Australia's temperate zone summer), and are followed by purple-striped green drupes (stone fruit). The fruit of persoonias are edible, and dispersed by wild vertebrates.

Taxonomy 

Persoonia terminalis was first reported by Lawrie Johnson of the Royal Botanic Gardens, Sydney, in the 1981 edition of Flora of New South Wales. He viewed it as a distinctive subspecies of Persoonia nutans, a broadly defined species  that included many forms since classified as distinct. Queensland botanists Trevor Donald Stanley and Estelle M. Ross classed P.terminalis as part of Persoonia oxycoccoides in their 1983 work Flora of South-eastern Queensland. They considered it more likely a species in its own right, as they believed the description of the Queensland populations did not match the P. oxycoccoides from central New South Wales. Upon re-examining Persoonia nutans and Persoonia oxycoccoides, Johnson and Peter Weston concluded that there were in fact several distinct species, and that Persoonia terminalis was described as such in 1991. The Herbarium houses over 1.2million other specimens. The generic name Persoonia is derived from the name of South African botanist Christiaan Hendrik Persoon. The specific name terminalis refers to the inflorescences (clusters of flowers) that are in this species at the ends of the branchlets. Its common name is the Torrington geebung.

It is classified within the genus as within the Lanceolata group, which consists of 58 closely related species with similar flowers but very different foliage. These species will often interbreed with each other in areas where two members of the group occur. P.terminalis has been reported to interbreed with Persoonia cornifolia and Persoonia sericea, two other members of the group.

Description 

It has smooth bark, although new growth is covered in fine hair. New leaves can be hairless or slightly hairy; if the latter, they lose the hair with age. They are concolorousthat is, both leaf surfaces are the same colour, or slightly discolorous (surfaces slightly different). The leaves are rougher than those of other persoonias.

The yellow flowers mainly appear in December and January (summer in the temperate zone of Australia), although occasional flowers have been seen as late as July. They are terminal, that is, arising at the ends of branchlets, where they appear in groups of one to five. P.terminalis is described as mostly anauxotelic, which means each stalk bears an individual flower that is subtended by a scale leaf at its junction with the stem. A proportion of flowers have a true leaf at this junction instead, and are described as auxotelic. Each individual flower consists of a cylindrical perianth that splits into four segments or tepals, and contains both male and female parts. Within this, the central style is surrounded by the anther, which splits into four segments; these curl back and resemble a cross when viewed from above. They provide a landing area for insects attending to the stigma, which is located at the tip of the style. Flowers are followed by the development of the fleshy purple-striped green drupes.

Distribution and habitat 

It grows on acidic, sandy or stony granite soils in dry sclerophyll forest. The region is dotted with granite outcrops, where  the subspecies is a component of Babingtonia odontocalyxBrachyloma saxicola shrubland and Prostanthera staurophyllaKunzea bracteolata low shrubland in the Torrington area, and Allocasuarina brachystachya shrubland in the Severn River Reserve. It is rated 2R on the ROTAP list.

Persooniat.subsp.recurva has two disjunct populations. It grows on acidic sandstone-based sandy soils in dry sclerophyll forest. Within the Warialda State Conservation Area, it is found in black cypress pine (Callitris endlicheri)dirty gum (Eucalyptus chloroclada) woodland and smooth-barked apple (Angophora leiocarpa)black cypress pine woodland. Although P.t.recurva has not been recorded from Kings Plains National Park, it could be expected to be found there due to the availability of suitable habitat. It is rated as 3R on the ROTAP list.

Both subspecies are commonly found near the Severn River Nature Preserve, as well as in the Arakoola Nature Reserve, where they are components of a woodland ecological community dominated by smooth-barked apple and long-fruited bloodwood (Corymbia dolichocarpa), which grows on sandstone soils.

Ecology 

Persoonia terminalis grows in a bushfire-prone habitat, where fire is essential for many species to regenerate. P.t.terminalis is killed by bushfire and regenerates from seed, which lies dormant in the soil. Large numbers of Persoonia seedlings appear after fire. However, rocky outcrop habitat is vulnerable to fires occurring at too-frequent intervals of less than five years, which puts many species that regenerate by seed at risk of local extinction as plants are unable to mature to set seed before the next fire.

Colletid bees of subgenus Cladocerapis within the genus Leioproctus exclusively forage on and pollinate flowers of many species of Persoonia. Bees of subgenus Filiglossa in the same genus also specialise in feeding on Persoonia flowers, but do not appear to be effective pollinators. The fruit are adapted to be eaten by vertebrates, such as kangaroos and possums, as well as currawongs and other large birds.

Cultivation potential 

Horticulturists and scientists Rodger Elliot and David L. Jones have proposed that cultivating the plant would aid in its conservation. Cultivating the plant would most likely require good water drainage, a sunny or part-shaded position and acidic soil. P.terminalis is hardy to heavy frosts, and is expected to fare better in a temperate rather than subtropical garden climate. Propagation would theoretically be by seed or by taking cuttings of new growth, though plants of the genus Persoonia are generally difficult to propagate by any means in cultivation.

Notes

References

External links 
 

Flora of New South Wales
terminalis
Plants described in 1991
Proteales of Australia
Shrubs